Trigonoorda trygoda is a moth in the family Crambidae. It was described by Edward Meyrick in 1897. It is found in Australia, where it has been recorded from Queensland, New South Wales and Western Australia.

The forewings are orange with dark submarginal lines. The hindwings are yellow with dark areas beside and along the margins. Adults have been recorded on wing in August.

References

Moths described in 1897
Odontiinae